"Keeping the Faith" is a song by rock singer-songwriter Billy Joel, released from his 1983 album An Innocent Man.  "Keeping the Faith" is the last track and final single from the album. The cover for the single shows an image of Joel and the judge (character actor Richard Shull) in the "jukebox" courtroom from the video.

It reached No. 18 on the main US Billboard Hot 100 chart and No. 3 on the US Billboard Adult Contemporary chart. The song was the only single from the album that failed to chart on the UK Singles Chart, despite the success of An Innocent Man in the United Kingdom.

Background
It is an autobiographical song about Joel's teenage years, with him reminiscing about the 1950s and 1960s lifestyle.  Joel told SiriusXM in 2016 that this song was kind of his way of explaining. Joel said that he did the song because he "owe[s] a great debt to that time in his life" and "to the wild guys he used to hang out with and the old rock and roll" that really inspired him.

Reception
Cash Box said that the song is "Joel at his melodic and lyric best, representing pure American pop music."

Music video
The music video for the song depicts a court trial to determine whether Joel is innocent and is "keeping the faith" (as the song "An Innocent Man" plays in the background). 

Richard Pryor makes a cameo appearance at the beginning of the video, standing at the bottom of the courthouse steps, reading a newspaper with the headline "Billy Joel: Guilty or Innocent?". The courtroom audience is populated by 1950s acts on one side, and 1960s acts (including a Jimi Hendrix lookalike) on the other, and shows Billy singing and dancing throughout the video.  

Joel's wife-to-be Christie Brinkley appears in the video as the "red haired girl in a Chevrolet". At the end, Joe Piscopo makes a cameo, reading a newspaper with the headline "Billy Joel: An Innocent Man!", and after giving a one hundred dollar tip, quips to a shoeshine boy, "Keep the faith, kid."

Chart positions

Track listing
The song was remixed for release as a 7" vinyl single.  An extended remix was also released on US promotional 12" vinyl singles (Columbia AS 1982).  Both 7" and 12" releases state "Special Mix" on the label and both have a printed run time of 4:44. 

The actual run times for the 7" and 12" are 4:52 and 5:27, respectively. The 7" remix has not been issued on CD. A 4:50 version of the 12" remix was released on the My Lives box set.

References 

1984 singles
1985 singles
Billy Joel songs
Songs written by Billy Joel
Song recordings produced by Phil Ramone
Columbia Records singles
1983 songs
Music videos directed by Jon Small